Pension tax simplification, often simply referred to as "pension simplification" and taking effect from A-day on 6 April 2006 was a policy announced in 2004 by the Labour government to rationalise the British tax system as applied to pension schemes. The aim was to reduce the complicated patchwork of legislation built-up by successive administrations which were seen as acting as a barrier to the public when considering retirement planning.  The government wanted to encourage retirement provision by simplifying the previous eight tax regimes into one single regime for all individual and occupational pensions.

Main changes
Broadly the new regime allows considerable freedom in the tax relievable contributions that may be made to pension schemes and the assets in which they may be invested. It also, however, caps the size of tax-favoured pension funds that may be accumulated by an individual. This 'lifetime allowance' was set at £1.6M for 2007–08. Funds accumulated in excess of the lifetime allowance are subject to a tax charge of 55%. Transitional protection provisions were made for individuals who had already accumulated pension funds in excess of this amount.

 Full concurrency – contribute to personal and occupational schemes at the same time
 Single tax regime – one set of tax rules
 Lifetime allowance – Amount of pension over which charges may be levied if you have no protection
 Annual allowance – obtain tax relief on contributions of up to £3,600 or 100% of income, if greater, subject to a maximum 
 Alternative secured pensions – possible to avoid purchasing an annuity even after age 75
 Single allowable investment regime – all schemes allowed to hold qualifying investments

The annual allowance for each tax year was set at:
2007–2008: £225,000
2008–2009: £235,000
2009–2010: £245,000
2010–2011: £255,000
2011–2012: £50,000
2012–2013: £50,000
2013–2014: £50,000
2014–2022: £40,000

Tax Year - Lifetime Allowance

2006/07 £1,500,000 
2007/08 £1,600,000 
2008/09 £1,650,000 
2009/10 £1,750,000 
2010/11 £1,800,000 
2011/12 £1,800,000 
2012/13 £1,500.000 
2013/14 £1,500.000 
2014/15 £1,250,000 
2015/16 £1,250,000 
2016/17 £1,000,000 
2017/18 £1,000,000 
2018/19 £1,030,000
2019/20 £1,055,000
2020/21 £1,073,100

In addition to the above changes, employees aged 50 or over can withdraw up to 25% of each of their pension funds as a tax–free lump sum when it comes into payment, whether or not they continue to work. The age at which a pension can begin to be paid was increased to 55 on 6 April 2010.

Member-directed pension schemes
A-Day introduced changes for the two types of member-directed pension scheme, SIPP and SSAS. These two different arrangements were largely brought into line with each other, with the following exceptions:
 SIPP would still be managed by an administrator;
 SSAS no longer requires a pensioner trustee;
 SSAS continues to be able to offer loans to a sponsoring employer, although such 'loanbacks' must now be secured against an asset of the borrower.

See also
Taxation in the United Kingdom
UK labour law
UK pensions
 Personal pensions
 Self-invested personal pensions
 Small Self Administered Schemes

Notes

References

External links
Association of Member-Directed Pension Schemes (AMPS) - The principal body for discussing changes involving Member-Directed Pension Schemes.

Pensions in the United Kingdom